This article is about the list of Desportivo da Praia players.  Desportivo da Praia is a Cape Verdean football (soccer) club based in Praia, Cape Verde and plays at Estádio da Várzea.  The club was formed in 1979.

List of players

Notes

References

External links
List of players at the official website 

Desportivo da Praia
Desportivo Praia
Association football player non-biographical articles